The history of West Virginia stems from the 1861 Wheeling Convention, which was an assembly of northwestern Virginian Southern Unionists, who aimed to repeal the Ordinance of Secession that Virginia made during the American Civil War (1861–1865). It became one of two American states that formed during the American Civil War – the other being Nevada in 1864. It was the only state to form from another state during this time, splitting from Virginia. West Virginia was officially admitted as a U.S. state on June 20, 1863.

The area that comprises West Virginia was originally part of the British Virginia Colony (1607–1776) and the western part of the U.S. state of Virginia (1776–1863). Western Virginia became sharply divided over the issue of secession from the Union, leading to the separation from Virginia, and formalized by West Virginia's admittance to the Union as a new state in 1863. West Virginia was one of five Civil War border states.

During the late 19th and early 20th century, West Virginia saw its population grow, due in large part to the economic job opportunities provided by the coal and logging industries. Since the mid-20th century, West Virginia has experienced population declines due in large part to its citizens leaving for opportunities elsewhere. West Virginia's history has been profoundly affected by its mountainous terrain, spectacular river valleys, and rich natural resources. These were all factors driving its state economy and the lifestyles of residents, as well as drawing visitors to the state. West Virginia's nickname is known as the "Mountain State" due to its landscape being largely covered by the Appalachian Mountains.

Prehistory

The area now known as West Virginia was a favorite hunting ground of numerous Native American peoples before the arrival of European settlers. Many ancient earthen mounds constructed by various mound builder cultures survive, especially in the areas of Moundsville, South Charleston, and Romney. The artifacts uncovered in these give evidence of a village society having a tribal trade system culture that practiced the cold working of copper to a limited extent. , over 12,500 archaeological sites have been documented in West Virginia.

Paleo-Indian culture appears by 10,500 BC in West Virginia passing along the major river valleys and ridge-line gap watersheds. Following are the traditional Archaic sub-periods; Early (8000–6000 BC), Middle (6000–4000 BC), and Late (4000–1000 BC). Within the greater region of and neighboring the Mountain State, the Riverton Tradition includes Maple Creek Phase. Also are the Buffalo Phase, Transitional Archaic Phase, Transitional Period Culture and Central Ohio Valley Archaic Phase. Also within the region is the Laurentian Archaic Tradition, which includes Brewerton Phase, Feeley Phase, Dunlop Phase, McKibben Phase, Genesee Phase, Stringtown/Satchel Phase, Satchel Phase and Lamoka/Dustin Phase.

The Adena provided the greatest cultural influence in the state. For practical purposes, the Adena is Early Woodland period according to West Virginia University's Dr. Edward V. McMichael, also among the 1963 Geological Survey. Middle and Late Woodland people include Middle Woodland Watson pottery people, Late Woodland Wood Phase, Late Hopewell at Romney, Montana (late Woodland AD 500–1000), Wilhelm culture (Late Middle Woodland, c. AD 1~500), Armstrong (Late Middle Woodland, c. AD 1~500), Buck Garden (Late Woodland AD 500–1200), Childers Phase (Late Middle Woodland c. 400 AD), and Parkline Phase (Late Woodland AD 750~1000). Adena villages can be characterized as rather large compared to Late Prehistoric tribes.

The Adena Indians used ceremonial pipes that were exceptional works of art. They lived in round (double post method) wicker sided and bark sheet roofed houses. Little is known about the housing of Paleo-Indian and Archaic periods, but Woodland Indians lived in wigwams. They grew sunflowers, tubers, gourds, squash and several seeds such as lambsquarter, may grass, sumpweed, smartweed and little barley cereals. In the Fort Ancient period, Indians lived in much larger poled rectangular shaped houses with walls hide covered. They were farmers who cultivated large fields around their villages, concentrating on corn, beans, tubers, sunflowers, gourds and many types of squash including the pumpkin. They also raised domestic turkeys and kept dogs as pets. Their neighbors in the northerly of the state, the Monongahela houses were generally circular in shape often with nook or storage appendage. Their living characteristics were more of a heritage from the Woodland Indians.

The Late Prehistoric (c. AD 950–1650) phases of the Fort Ancient Tradition include Feurt Phase, Blennerhassett Phase, Bluestone Phase, Clover Complex followed by the Orchard Phase (c. AD 1550–1650) with a Late Proto-historic arrival of a Lizard Cult from the Southeastern Ceremonial Complex. Contemporaneously to Fort Ancient Tradition southerly of the state, the sister culture called Monongahela is found on the northerly of the Mountain State stemming from the Drew Tradition. Early historic tribes living within or routinely hunting and trading within the state include Calicuas later mixed in colonial north-western Virginia-Pennsylvania at the time as popular termed Cherokee, Mohetans, Rickohockans from ancient Nation du Chat area, Monetons and Monecaga or Monacan, Tomahitans or Yuchi-Occaneechi, Tuscarora or mixed broad termed Mingoe & Canawagh or Kanawhas (Chiroenhaka), Oniasantkeronons or Tramontane of the proto-historic southerly Neutral Nation trade empire (element Nation du Chat), Shattera or Tutelo, Ouabano or Mohican-Delaware, Chaouanon or Shawnee, Cheskepe or Shawnee-Yuchi, Loupe (Captina Island historic mix, Lanape & Powhatan), Tionontatacaga and Little Mingoe (Guyandottes), Massawomeck and later mixed as Mohawk, Susquesahanock or White Minqua later mixed Mingoes and Arrigahaga or Black Minqua of the Nation du Chat and proto-historic Neutral Nation trade empire.

Within the Mountain State, these tribal villages can be characterized as rather small and scattered as they moved about the old fields every couple of generations. Many would join other tribes and remove to the midwest regions as settlers arrived in the state. Although, there were those who would acculturate within the historic as sometimes called Fireside Cabin culture. Some are early historic documented seeking protection closer, moving to the easterly colonial trade towns. And later, other small splintered clans were attracted to, among others, James Le Tort, Charles Poke and John Van Metre trading houses within the state. This historic period changed the way of living extends from a little before the 18th century Virginia and Pennsylvania region North American fur trade beginning on the Eastern Panhandle of the state.

European exploration and settlement

In 1671, General Abraham Wood, at the direction of Royal Governor William Berkeley of the Virginia Colony, sent the party of Thomas Batts and Robert Fallum into the West Virginia area. During this expedition the pair followed the New River and discovered Kanawha Falls.

On July 13, 1709, Louis Michel, George Ritter, and Baron Christoph von Graffenried petitioned the King of England for a land grant in the Harpers Ferry, Shepherdstown area, Jefferson County, in order to establish a Swiss colony. Neither the land grant or the Swiss colony ever materialized.

Lt. Governor Alexander Spotswood is sometimes credited with taking his 1716 "Knights of the Golden Horseshoe Expedition" into what is now Pendleton County, although according to contemporary accounts, Spotswood's trail went no farther west than Harrisonburg, Virginia. The Treaty of Albany, 1722, designated the Blue Ridge Mountains as the western boundary of white settlement, and recognized Iroquois rights on the west side of the ridge, including all of West Virginia. Though the Iroquois made little effort to settle the region themselves, they made war throughout the area with their enemies, following the Great Indian Warpaths through the region and, some time between 1725–1750, contracted a large group of the Saponi-Tutelo warriors the Iroquois had living on the Susquehanna River in Pennsylvania to fight alongside them in the region. 

They were adopted into the Seneca as a reward and settled in Randolph County, calling themselves the Blackfoot Senecas, though a great many Saponi stayed behind and were later incorporated into the Iroquois by other means. Other tribes, notably the Shawnee and Cherokee, used the resources of the region as well. Soon after this, white settlers began moving into the Greater Shenandoah-Potomac Valley making up the entire eastern portion of the state. They found it largely unoccupied, apart from Tuscaroras who had lately moved into the area around Martinsburg, WV, some Shawnee villages in the region around Moorefield, WV and Winchester, VA, and frequent passing bands of "Northern Indians" (Lenape from New Jersey) and "Southern Indians" (Catawba from South Carolina) who were engaged in a bitter long-distance war, using the Valley as a battleground.

John Van Metre, an Indian trader, penetrated into the northern portion of West Virginia in 1725. Also in 1725, Pearsall's Flats in the South Branch Potomac River valley, present-day Romney, was settled, and later became the site of the French and Indian War stockade, Fort Pearsall. Morgan ap Morgan, a Welshman, built a cabin near present-day Bunker Hill in Berkeley County in 1727. The same year German settlers from Pennsylvania founded New Mecklenburg, the present Shepherdstown, on the Potomac River, and others soon followed.

Orange County, Virginia was formed in 1734. It included all areas west of the Blue Ridge Mountains, constituting all of present West Virginia. However, in 1736 the Iroquois Six Nations protested Virginia's colonization beyond the demarcated Blue Ridge, and a skirmish was fought in 1743. The Iroquois were on the point of threatening all-out war against the Virginia Colony over the "Cohongoruton lands", which would have been destructive and devastating, when Governor Gooch bought out their claim for 400 pounds at the Treaty of Lancaster (1744).

In 1661, King Charles II of England had granted a company of gentleman the land between the Potomac and Rappahannock rivers, known as the Northern Neck. The grant eventually came into the possession of Thomas Fairfax, 6th Lord Fairfax of Cameron and in 1746 a stone was erected at the source of the North Branch Potomac River to mark the western limit of the grant. A considerable part of this land was surveyed by George Washington, especially the South Branch Potomac River valley between 1748 and 1751. The diary kept by Washington indicates that there were already many squatters, largely of German origin, along the South Branch. Christopher Gist, a surveyor for the first Ohio Company, which was composed chiefly of Virginians, explored the country along the Ohio River north of the mouth of the Kanawha River in 1751 and 1752. The company sought to have a fourteenth colony established with the name Vandalia.

Many settlers crossed the mountains after 1750, though they were hindered by Native American resistance. The 1744 Treaty of Lancaster had left ambiguous whether the Iroquois had sold only as far as the Alleghenies, or all their claim south of the Ohio, including the rest of modern West Virginia. At the convening of the 1752 Treaty of Logstown, they acknowledged the right of English settlements south of the Ohio, but the Cherokee and Shawnee claims still remained. During the French and Indian War (1754–1763), the scattered settlements were almost destroyed. The Proclamation of 1763 again confirmed all land beyond the Alleghenies as Indian Territory, but the Iroquois finally relinquished their claims south of the Ohio to Britain at the Treaty of Fort Stanwix in 1768.

Most of the Cherokee claim within West Virginia, the southwestern part of the state, was sold to Virginia in 1770 by the Treaty of Lochaber. In 1774, the Crown Governor of Virginia, John Murray, 4th Earl of Dunmore, led a force over the mountains, and a body of militia under Colonel Andrew Lewis dealt the Shawnee Indians under Cornstalk a crushing blow at the junction of the Kanawha and Ohio rivers, in the Battle of Point Pleasant. Following this conflict, known as Dunmore's War, the Shawnee and Mingo ceded their rights south of the Ohio, that is, to West Virginia and Kentucky. But renegade Cherokee chief Dragging Canoe continued to dispute the settlers' advance, fighting the Cherokee–American wars (1776–1794) until after the American Revolutionary War. During the war, the settlers in western Virginia were generally active Whigs and many served in the Continental Army.

Early river traffic

By 1739, Thomas Shepherd had constructed a flour mill powered by water from the Town Run or the Falling Springs Branch of the Potomac River in present-day Shepherdstown.

In October 1748, the Virginia General Assembly passed an act establishing a ferry across the Potomac River from the landing of Evan Watkin near the mouth of Conococheague Creek in present-day Berkeley County to the property of Edmund Wade in Maryland. In March 1761, Robert Harper obtained a permit to operate a ferry across the Shenandoah River at present-day Harpers Ferry, Jefferson County. The two ferry crossings became the earliest locations of government authorized civilian commercial crafts on what would become a part of the West Virginia Waterways.

During the late 17th and early 18th centuries, a growing demand for beaver sent trappers up and down the Kanawha region's tributary creeks by canoe and raft. Trading posts were established at the confluence of the Ohio and Kanawha Rivers at Point Pleasant, West Virginia where, in the mid 1780s, Daniel Boone resided for several years. Likewise, St. Albans, West Virginia, at the confluence of the Kanawha and Coal Rivers, became a point of trade.

In the late 18th century, the steel trap increased efficiency, and beaver became scarce. A shift to exporting the state's other natural resources began. Kanawha salt production followed by coal and timber could be seen on the waterways. A number of riverside locations were used for early Industrial Revolution production. Keelboats were built in the Kanawha region in Leon, Ravenswood Murraysville, and Little Kanawha River. 19th century steamboats were built and repaired in Wheeling, Parkersburg, Point Pleasant and Mason City. Wooden coal barges were built on the Monongahela River near Morgantown, as well as along Coal River and Elk River.

The logging industry furthered the river shipping industry. A horse-drawn logging "tram" with a special block and tackle for hill-side harvesting was brought into use, allowing expansion of Crooked Creek and the opening of a wooden barrel plant at the creek's mouth. In the 1880s, this tram and other steam machinery were used for collecting timber used as railroad ties in the railway construction along the Kanawha river. Railroad spurs were built throughout West Virginia, connecting mines to the riverboats, barges and coal-tipples.

Trans-Allegheny Virginia, 1776–1861

Social conditions in western Virginia were entirely unlike those in the eastern portion of the state. The population was not homogeneous, as a considerable part of the immigration came by way of Pennsylvania and included Germans, Protestant Scotch-Irish, and settlers from the states farther north. Counties in the east and south were settled mostly by eastern Virginians. During the American Revolution, the movement to create a state west of the Alleghenies was revived and a petition for the establishment of "Westsylvania" was presented to Congress, on the grounds that the mountains presented an almost impassable barrier to the east. The rugged nature of the country made slavery unprofitable, and time only increased the social, political, economic, and cultural differences  between the two sections of Virginia.

In 1829, a constitutional convention met in Richmond to consider reforms to Virginia's outdated constitution. Philip Doddridge of Brooke County championed the cause of western Virginians who sought a more democratic frame of government. However, western reforms were rejected by leaders from east of the Alleghenies who "clung to political power in an effort to preserve their plantation lifestyles dependent on enslaving blacks." Virginia leaders maintained a property qualification for suffrage effectively disenfranchising poorer farmers in the west, whose families did much of the farm work themselves. In addition, the Virginia Constitutional Convention of 1829–1830 gave the slave-owning counties the benefit of three-fifths of their slave population in apportioning representation in the Virginia Assembly. As a result, every county west of the Alleghenies except one voted to reject the constitution, which nevertheless passed because of eastern support. Failure of the eastern planter elite to make constitutional reforms exacerbated existing east–west sectionalism in Virginia and contributed to Virginia's later split.

The Virginia Constitutional Convention of 1850–51, the Reform Convention, addressed a number of issues important to western Virginians. It extended the vote to all white males 21 years or older. The governor, lieutenant-governor, the judiciary, sheriffs, and other county officers were to be elected by public vote. The composition of the General Assembly was changed. Representation in the house of delegates was apportioned on the basis of the census of 1850, counting whites only. The Senate representation was arbitrarily fixed at 50 seats, with the west receiving twenty, and the east thirty senators. This was made acceptable to the west by a provision that required the General Assembly to reapportion representation on the basis of white population in 1865, or else put the matter to a public referendum. But the east also gave itself a tax advantage in requiring a property tax at true and actual value, except for slaves. Slaves under the age of 12 years were not taxed and slaves over that age were taxed at only $300, a fraction of their true value. Small farmers, however, had all their assets, animals, and land taxed at full value. Despite this tax and the lack of internal improvements in the west, the vote was 75,748 for and 11,063 against the new Constitution. Most of the opposition came from delegates from eastern counties, who did not like the compromises made for the west.

For the western areas, problems included the distance from the state seat of government in Richmond and the difference of common economic interests resultant from the tobacco and food crops farming, fishing, and coastal shipping to the east of the Eastern Continental Divide (waters which drain to the Atlantic Ocean) along the Allegheny Mountains, and the interests of the western portion which drained to the Ohio and Mississippi rivers and the Gulf of Mexico.

The western area focused its commerce on neighbors to the west, and many citizens felt that the more populous eastern areas were too dominant in the Virginia General Assembly and insensitive to their needs. Major crises in the Virginia state government over these differences were averted on more than one occasion during the period before the American Civil War, but the underlying problems were fundamental and never well resolved. Given these differences, many in the west had long contemplated a separate state. In particular, men such as lawyer Francis H. Pierpont from Fairmont, had long chafed under the political domination of the Tidewater and Piedmont slave-holders. In addition to differences over the abolition of slavery, he and allies felt the Virginia government ignored and refused to spend funds on needed internal improvements in the west, such as turnpikes and railroads.

John Brown at Harpers Ferry, 1859

John Brown (1800–1859), an abolitionist who saw slavery as a sin against God, led a successful anti-slavery movement in Kansas , and hoped to strike a decisive blow against Southern slavery, creating a massive "underground railroad"–type project, in the central and southern Appalachian Mountains, that would assist the enslaved in running away and becoming free. With only 21 followers, in October of 1859 he took hostages and freed slaves in Harpers Ferry, at that time in Virginia. Locals forced him to take refuge in the Armory firehouse, later called "John Brown's Fort"; a unit of U.S. Marines led by Robert E. Lee stormed the firehouse and took Brown prisoner, almost killing him. Brown was quickly convicted of treason against the Commonwealth of Virginia, murder, and fomenting a slave insurrection, and was hanged on December 2. Six followers were also tried, convicted, and executed.

Civil War and split

In 1861, as the United States itself became massively divided over slavery, leading to the American Civil War (1861–1865), the western regions of Virginia split with the eastern portion politically, and the two were never reconciled as a single state again. In 1863, the western region was admitted to the Union as a new separate state, initially planned to be called the State of Kanawha, but ultimately named West Virginia.

Separation

On April 17, 1861, the Richmond convention voted on the Ordinance of Secession. Of the 49 delegates from the future state of West Virginia, 17 voted in favor, and 30 voted against, and two abstained. Almost immediately after the adoption of the ordinance, a mass meeting at Clarksburg recommended that each county in northwestern Virginia send delegates to a convention to meet in Wheeling on May 13, 1861.

When the First Wheeling Convention met, 425 delegates from 25 counties were present, but a division of sentiment soon arose. Some delegates favored the immediate formation of a new state, while others argued that, as Virginia's secession had not yet been ratified or become effective, such action would constitute revolution against the United States. It was decided that if the ordinance were adopted (of which there was little doubt) another convention including the members-elect of the legislature should meet at Wheeling in June 1861.

In a referendum on May 23, 1861, secession was ratified by a large majority in the state as a whole. But in the western counties that would form the state of West Virginia, the vote was approximately 34,677 against and 19,121 for ratification of the Ordinance of Secession.

The Second Wheeling Convention met as agreed on June 11, 1861, and adopted "A Declaration of the People of Virginia". This document, drafted by former state senator John S. Carlile, declared that the Virginia Declaration of Rights required any substantial change in the nature or form of the state government to be approved by the people. Therefore, since the Secession Convention had been called by the legislature and not the people, all its acts were illegal. It further declared the pro-secession government in Richmond void and called for a reorganization of the state government, taking the line that all who adhered to the Ordinance of Secession had effectively vacated their offices. The convention passed an act for the reorganization of the government on June 19, 1861. On the following day, the convention chose Francis H. Pierpont as governor of the "Restored Government of Virginia", elected other officers, and adjourned. The legislature of the Restored Government was composed of members from the western counties who had been elected on May 23, 1861, and some senators who had been elected in 1859. It met at Wheeling on July 1, 1861, filled the remainder of the state offices, completed the reorganization of the state government, and elected two United States senators who were quickly seated in Washington. There were, therefore, two governments claiming to represent all of Virginia, one owing allegiance to the United States and one to the Confederacy.

Even before the American Civil War, counties in northwest Virginia had desired to break away from Virginia to form a new state. However, the federal Constitution did not allow a new state to be created out of an existing state unless the existing state gave its consent. Soon after the Union government declared that the Restored Government was the legitimate government of the Commonwealth, the Restored Government asserted its authority to give such approval. It authorized the creation of the State of Kanawha, consisting of most of the counties that now comprise West Virginia. A little over one month later, Kanawha was renamed West Virginia. The Wheeling Convention, which had taken a recess until August 6, 1861, reassembled on August 20, 1861, and called for a popular vote on the formation of a new state and for a convention to frame a constitution if the vote should be favorable.

In the election held on October 24, 1861, 18,408 votes were cast for the new state and only 781 against. At this time, West Virginia had nearly 70,000 qualified voters, and the May 23, 1861 vote to secede had drawn nearly 54,000 voters. However, most of the pro-Confederate elements no longer considered themselves citizens of the United States; they saw themselves as citizens of another country (the Confederacy) and did not vote in elections sponsored by the United States. Votes from the secessionist counties in the October 24 vote on statehood were mostly cast by refugees in the area around Wheeling, not in the counties themselves. In secessionist counties where a poll was conducted it was by military intervention. Even in some counties that had voted against secession, such as Wayne and Cabell, it was necessary to send in Union soldiers.

 
Returns from some counties were as low as 5%, e.g. Raleigh County 32–0 in favor of statehood, Clay 76–0, Braxton 22–0, and some gave no returns at all. The Constitutional Convention began on November 26, 1861, and finished its work on February 18, 1862. The instrument was ratified on April 11, 1862, with 18,162 votes for and 514 against.

The composition of all three Wheeling Conventions, the May (First) Convention, the June (Second) Convention, and the Constitutional Convention, was of an irregular nature. The members of the May Convention were chosen by groups of Unionists, mostly in the far Northwestern counties. Over one-third came from the counties around the northern panhandle. The May Convention resolved to meet again in June 1861 should the Ordinance of Secession be ratified by public poll on May 23, 1861, which was the case. The June 1861 convention consisted of 104 members, 35 of which were members of the General Assembly in Richmond, some elected in the May 23 vote, and some hold-over State Senators. Arthur Laidley, elected to the General Assembly from Cabell County, attended the June Convention but refused to take part. The other delegates to the June Convention were "chosen even more irregularly-some in mass meetings, others by county committee, and still others were seemingly self-appointed". It was this June Convention which drafted the statehood resolution. The Constitutional Convention met in November 1861, and consisted of 61 members. Its composition was just as irregular. A delegate representing Logan County was accepted as a member of this body, though he did not live in Logan County, and his "credentials consisted of a petition signed by fifteen persons representing six families". The large number of Northerners in this convention caused great distrust over the new Constitution during Reconstruction years. In 1872, under the leadership of Samuel Price, former Lt. Governor of Virginia, the Wheeling constitution was discarded, and an entirely new one was written along ante-bellum principles.

At first the Wheeling politicians controlled only a small part of West Virginia. However, federal forces soon drove the Confederates out of most of West Virginia.

On May 13, 1862, the state legislature of the reorganized government approved the formation of the new state. An application for admission to the Union was made to Congress. On December 31, 1862, an enabling act was approved by President Lincoln, admitting West Virginia on the condition that a provision for the gradual abolition of slavery be inserted in the Constitution. The convention was reconvened on February 12, 1863, and the demand was met. The revised constitution was adopted on March 26, 1863, and on April 20, 1863, President Lincoln issued a proclamation admitting the state at the end of 60 days, on June 20, 1863. Meanwhile, officers for the new state were chosen, and Governor Pierpont moved the Restored Government to Alexandria from which he asserted jurisdiction over the counties of Virginia within the federal lines.

Legality
The constitutionality of the new state was achieved when the Unionist government of Virginia approved the division. The question of the addition of two counties came before the Supreme Court of the United States in the case of Virginia v. West Virginia, 78 U.S. 39 (1871). Berkeley and Jefferson counties lying on the Potomac east of the mountains, in 1863, with the consent of the Reorganized government of Virginia voted in favor of annexation to West Virginia. Many men absent in the Confederate army when the vote was taken refused to acknowledge the transfer upon their return. The Virginia General Assembly repealed the act of cession and in 1866 brought suit against West Virginia asking the court to declare the two counties a part of Virginia. Meanwhile, Congress on March 10, 1866, passed a joint resolution recognizing the transfer. The Supreme Court decided in favor of West Virginia, and there has been no further question.

Civil War
During the American Civil War, West Virginia suffered comparatively little. General George B. McClellan's forces gained possession of the greater part of the territory in the summer of 1861. Following Confederate General Robert E. Lee's defeat at Cheat Mountain in the same year, supremacy in western Virginia was never again seriously challenged. In 1863, General John D. Imboden, with 5,000 Confederate soldiers, overran a considerable portion of the state. Bands of guerrillas burned and plundered in some sections, and were not entirely suppressed until after the war was ended. Estimates of the numbers of Civil War soldiers from the state, both within the Union and Confederacy, have varied widely, but recent studies have placed the numbers about equal, from 22,000 to 25,000 each. 

The low vote turnout for the statehood referendum was due to many factors. On June 19, 1861, the Wheeling convention enacted a bill entitled "Ordinance to Authorize the Apprehending of Suspicious Persons in Time of War" which stated that anyone who supported Richmond or the Confederacy "shall be deemed... subjects or citizens of a foreign State or power at war with the United States." Many private citizens were arrested by federal authorities at the request of Wheeling and interned in prison camps, most notably Camp Chase in Columbus, Ohio. Soldiers were also stationed at the polls to discourage secessionists and their supporters. In addition, a large portion of the state was secessionist, and any polls there had to be conducted under military intervention. The vote was further compromised by the presence of an undetermined number of non-resident soldier votes.

At the Constitutional Convention on December 14, 1861, the issue of slavery was raised by Rev. Gordon Battelle, an Ohio native who sought to introduce a resolution for gradual emancipation. Granville Parker, originally from Massachusetts and a member of the convention, described the scene – "I discovered on that occasion as I never had before, the mysterious and over-powering influence 'the peculiar institution' had on men otherwise sane and reliable. Why, when Mr. Battelle submitted his resolutions, a kind of tremor – a holy horror, was visible throughout the house!" Instead of Rev. Battelle's resolution a policy of "Negro exclusion" for the new state was adopted to keep any new slaves, or freemen, from taking up residence, in the hope that this would satisfy abolitionist sentiment in Congress. When the statehood bill reached Congress, however, the lack of an emancipation clause prompted opposition from Senator Charles Sumner and Senator Benjamin Wade of Ohio. A compromise was reached known as the Willey Amendment which was approved by Unionist voters in the state on March 26, 1863. It called for the gradual emancipation of slaves based on age after July 4, 1863. Slavery was officially abolished by West Virginia on February 3, 1865. To note, it took the ratification of the 13th Amendment to the U.S. Constitution accomplished on December 6, 1865, to abolish slavery nationwide.

During the war and for years afterwards, partisan feeling ran high. The property of Confederates might be confiscated, and, in 1866, a constitutional amendment disfranchising all who had given aid and comfort to the Confederacy was adopted. The addition of the 14th and 15th Amendments to the United States Constitution caused a reaction, the Democratic Party secured control in 1870, and in 1871, the Constitutional Amendment of 1866 was abrogated. The first steps toward this change had been taken, however, by the Republicans in 1870. On August 22, 1872, an entirely new constitution was adopted.

Following the war, Virginia unsuccessfully brought a case to the Supreme Court challenging the secession of Berkeley County and Jefferson County to West Virginia. (Five more counties were formed later, to result in the current 55).

President Lincoln was in a close campaign when he won reelection in 1864 with the majority of the popular vote and 212 electoral votes, versus 21 electoral votes cast for his Democratic opponent. However, the act that created West Virginia was signed in 1862, two years before Lincoln's re-election.

Enduring disputes
Beginning in Reconstruction, and for several decades thereafter, the two states disputed the new state's share of the pre-war Virginia government's debt, which had mostly been incurred to finance public infrastructure improvements, such as canals, roads, and railroads under the Virginia Board of Public Works. Virginians led by former Confederate General William Mahone formed a political coalition based upon this theory, the Readjuster Party. Although West Virginia's first constitution provided for the assumption of a part of the Virginia debt, negotiations opened by Virginia in 1870 were fruitless, and in 1871 that state funded two-thirds of the debt and arbitrarily assigned the remainder to West Virginia. The issue was finally settled in 1915, when the United States Supreme Court ruled that West Virginia owed Virginia $12,393,929.50. The final installment of this sum was paid off in 1939.

Disputes about the exact location of the border in some of the northern mountain reaches between Loudoun County, Virginia and Jefferson County, West Virginia continued well into the 20th century. In 1991, both state legislatures appropriated money for a boundary commission to look into  of the border area.

In recent years, there has been serious talk about the possibility of certain counties in the Eastern Panhandle rejoining the Commonwealth of Virginia. Frustrated by bad economic conditions and what they perceive to be neglect from the Charleston government, this movement has gained at least some momentum. In 2011, West Virginia state delegate Larry Kump sponsored legislation to allow Morgan, Berkeley, and Jefferson counties to rejoin Virginia by popular vote.

Resources

Salt
The new state benefited from development of its mineral resources more than any other single economic activity after Reconstruction. Salt mining had been underway since the 18th century, though that which could be easily obtained had largely played out by the time of the American Civil War, when the red salt of Kanawha County was a valued commodity of first Confederate, and later Union forces. Newer technology has since proved that West Virginia has enough salt resources to supply the nation's needs for an estimated 2,000 years. During recent years, production has been about 600,000 to 1,000,000 tons per year.

Timber
West Virginia was forested. During the period 1870 to 1920 most of the old-growth forest was logged. Logging was supported by a dense rail network extending throughout the mountains and hollows. Small pockets of virgin forest remain at Gaudineer Scenic Area and Cathedral State Park.

Coal
In the 1850s, geologists such as British expert Dr. David T. Ansted (1814–1880), surveyed potential coal fields and invested in land and early mining projects. After the war, with the new railroads came a practical method to transport large quantities of coal to expanding U.S. and export markets. Among the numerous investors were Charles Pratt and New York City mayor Abram S. Hewitt, whose father-in-law, Peter Cooper, had been a key man in earlier development of the anthracite coal regions centered in eastern Pennsylvania and northwestern New Jersey. As those mines were playing out by the end of the 19th century, these men were among investors and industrialists who focused new interest on the largely untapped coal resources of West Virginia.

Accidents in coal mines
Rakes (2008) examines coal mine fatalities in the state in the first half of the 20th century before safety regulations were strictly enforced in the 1960s. Besides the well-publicized mine disasters that killed a number of miners at a time, there were many smaller episodes in which one or two miners lost their lives. Mine accidents were considered inevitable, and mine safety did not appreciably improve the situation because of lax enforcement. West Virginia's mines were considered so unsafe that immigration officials would not recommend them as a source of employment for immigrants, and those unskilled immigrants who did work in the coal mines were more susceptible to death or injury. When the United States Bureau of Mines was given more authority to regulate mine safety in the 1960s, safety awareness improved, and West Virginia coal mines became less dangerous.

Early railroads, shipping to East Coast and Great Lakes
The completion of the Chesapeake and Ohio Railway (C&O) westerly across the state from Richmond, Virginia to the new city of Huntington on the Ohio River in 1872 opened access to the New River Coalfield. Within 10 years, the C&O was building tracks east from Richmond down the Virginia Peninsula to reach its huge coal pier at the new city of Newport News, Virginia on the large harbor of Hampton Roads. There, city founder Collis P. Huntington also developed what would become the largest shipbuilder in the world, Newport News Shipbuilding and Drydock Company. Among its many products, the shipyard began building ocean-going ships, known as colliers, to transport coal to other eastern ports (notably in New England) and overseas.

In 1881, the new Philadelphia-based owners of William Mahone's former Atlantic, Mississippi and Ohio Railroad (AM&O) which stretched across Virginia's southern tier from Norfolk, had sights clearly set on the Mountain State, where the owners had large land holdings. Their railroad was renamed Norfolk and Western (N&W), and a new railroad city was developed at Roanoke to handle planned expansion. After its new President Frederick J. Kimball and a small party journeyed by horseback and saw firsthand the rich bituminous coal seam (which Kimball's wife named "Pocahontas," the N&W redirected its planned westward expansion to reach it. Soon, the N&W was also shipping from its own new coal piers on Hampton Roads at Lamberts Point outside Norfolk. In 1889, in the southern part of the state, along the Norfolk and Western rail lines, the important coal center of Bluefield, West Virginia was founded. The "capital" of the Pocahontas coalfield, this city would remain the largest city in the southern portion of the state for several decades. It shares a sister city with the same name, Bluefield, in Virginia.

In the northern portion of the state and elsewhere, the older Baltimore and Ohio Railroad (B&O) and other lines also expanded to take advantage of coal opportunities as well. The B&O developed coal piers in Baltimore and at several points on the Great Lakes. Other significant rail carriers of coal were the Western Maryland Railway (WM), particularly notable was a latecomer, the Virginian Railway (VGN), built in an extraordinary manner to the latest and highest standards and completed in 1909.

New competitor helps open "Billion Dollar Coalfield"
By 1900, only a large area of the most rugged terrain of southern West Virginia was any distance from the existing railroads and mining activity. Within this area west of the New River Coalfield in Raleigh and Wyoming counties lay the Winding Gulf Coalfield, later promoted as the "Billion Dollar Coalfield."

A protégé of Dr. Ansted was William Nelson Page (1854–1932), a civil engineer and mining manager based at Ansted in Fayette County. Former West Virginia Governor William A. MacCorkle described him as a man who knew the land "as a farmer knows a field." Beginning in 1898, Page teamed with northern and European-based investors to take advantage of the undeveloped area.

Although the Deepwater plan should have provided a competitive shipping market via either railroad, leaders of the two large railroads did not appreciate the scheme and sought to discourage competition in an area they considered theirs for expansion plans. In secret, but lawful collusion (in an era before U.S. antitrust laws were enacted), each declined to negotiate favorable rates with Page, nor did they offer to purchase his railroad, as they had many other short-lines. However, if the C&O and N&W presidents thought they could thus kill the Page project, they were to be proved mistaken. One of the silent partner investors Page had enlisted was millionaire industrialist Henry Huttleston Rogers, a principal in John D. Rockefeller's Standard Oil Trust and an old hand at developing natural resources, transportation. A master at competitive "warfare", Henry Rogers did not like to lose in his endeavors, and also had "deep pockets".

In early 1904, the Tidewater Railway, a new railroad, was quietly formed in Virginia by a Rogers attorney. The necessary sections of right-of way and land were acquired before the large railroads realized what was happening. Efforts to block Page and Rogers through many legal tactics and even several violent confrontations ultimately failed.

With Page as its first president, and largely financed from Rogers' personal fortune, and the two railroads were merged in 1907 to form the Virginian Railway (VGN). Building the Virginian Railway cost $40 million by the time it was completed in 1909. Well-engineered and highly efficient with all new infrastructure, it operated very profitably. The Class 1 railroad came to be known as the "Richest Little Railroad in the World."

Notwithstanding the competitive fears of the C&O and N&W, soon all three railroads were shipping ever-increasing volumes of coal to export from Hampton Roads. The VGN and the N&W ultimately became parts of the modern Norfolk Southern system, and the VGN's well-engineered 20th-century tracks continue to offer a favorable gradient to Hampton Roads. In the early 20th century, West Virginia coal was also under high demand at Great Lakes ports on Lake Erie. Coal transloading facilities were developed at several points, notably Toledo, Ohio.

Labor, ecology issues
As coal mining and related work became a major employment activities in the state, there was considerable labor strife as working conditions and safety issues, as well as economic ones arose. Even in the 21st century, mining safety and ecological concerns are challenging to the state whose coal continues to power electrical generating plants in many other states.

20th century

Woman suffrage
West Virginia suffragists worked at supporting the agendas put forward by the National American Woman Suffrage Association, the National Association of Colored Women and the Woman's Christian Temperance Union in the 1890s through the early part of the 20th century. According to historian Anne Wallace Effland, conservative social and religious beliefs together with the campaigns by anti-suffragists kept up a solid defense against them. The organized work by women's clubs during World War I helped convince legislators of their role in getting their women enfranchised. After a failed attempt to include woman suffrage as a state constitutional amendment in 1916, pro-suffrage Governor John J. Cornwell included the ratification of the federal amendment for woman suffrage in the agenda for a special legislative session in February 1920. The West Virginia Equal Suffrage Association under the leadership of President Mrs. John L. Ruhl and WVESA Ratification Committee chair Lenna Lowe Yost created a "living petition" of suffragists who greeted and personally lobbied each legislator as they prepared to vote. This strategy was a success, and West Virginia became the 34th of the 36 states needed to ratify the Nineteenth Amendment to the United States Constitution.

State hatcheries and tourism industry
Wildlife biologist Robert Silvester of the State Wildlife Center wrote a history of conservation in West Virginia. He explains as industry developed in the region, the people of West Virginia saw a need for wildlife conservation. The Wildlife and Fish Commission was created in 1921. The commission established the French Creek Game Farm in 1923. Various game animals and now protected birds were raised for conservation repopulating or control reasons throughout the state. Coincidentally, it was similar to an indigenous species open zoo of today and became a place of family outings visitation. The following years saw a significant growth of visitors. Buffalo were included in 1954 and attracted additional visitors. Today, the zoological facility is of  modern Wildlife Center under the direction of the Division of Natural Resources.

Mike Shingleton of the Division of Natural Resources explained the Centennial Golden Trout evolution. At the small rainbow trout hatchery in 1955, a yellow-mottled fingerling was noticed by Petersburg manager Vincent Evans. From that small batch of hatchlings he named it "Little Camouflage". Months later upon his arrival, the new Petersburg manager, Chester Mace, was shown the curious novelty. In limited facilities of late 1956, "Goldy" had spawn with a few Rainbow trout. A few months later in 1957, the Petersburg hatchery moved these yellow-mottles to the larger Spring Run hatchery. By the spring stocking of 1963, the West Virginia Centennial year, Evans and Mace had supervised the spawning of good color and quality brood stock of the Mountain State's Centennial Golden Trout.

World War II
West Virginia enthusiastically supported World War II, with 67,000 men and about 1,000 women donning uniforms. Unemployment ended as the mines, railroads, mills and factories worked overtime to create the "Arsenal of Democracy" that supplied the munitions to win the war. However, repeatedly John L. Lewis called his United Mine Workers union out on strike, defying the government, outraging public opinion, and strengthening the hand of anti-union Congressmen. In the postwar years, he continued his militancy; his miners went on strikes or "work stoppages" annually. 

Edwards (2008) explores the roles of women volunteers in West Virginia during World War II. Women volunteered for farm and home economics training programs, United Service Organizations (USO) clubs that provided entertainment and assistance to servicemen, salvage campaigns to produce steel scrap, and civil defense training that taught first aid and emergency response techniques. Middle-class women made up the majority of volunteers; many programs were not open to African American and lower-class white women. Some West Virginia women also volunteered for military service, which was available to African American women. In spite of sexism, racism, and class distinctions that women faced in volunteering, thousands responded to the national war effort.

School integration
The response in West Virginia to the 1954 Brown v. Board of Education Supreme Court decision outlawing segregated schools was generally positive, as Governor William C. Marland pledged to integrate the state's schools. The state's integration experiences were generally peaceful, swift and cooperative.

Vietnam War
During the Vietnam War a total of 36,578 West Virginians served, with most beginning as teenagers. As the war went on, many citizens began to turn against the conflict. 711 of the state's citizens died during the war. Nine West Virginians were awarded the Medal of Honor during Vietnam.

See also

 History of Appalachia
 History of the Upland South
 History of Virginia
 Former counties, cities, and towns of Virginia
 Readjuster Party
 West Virginia State Museum
 Wheeling Convention
 List of Registered Historic Places in West Virginia
 Charles Henry Ambler – Preeminent historian of West Virginia history

Notes

References and bibliography

Surveys
Abramson, Rudy, and Jean Haskell, eds. Encyclopedia of Appalachia (2006) 1864pp; 2000 articles by experts
Charles H. Ambler and Festus P. Summers. West Virginia, the Mountain State (1958) a standard history
Brisbin, Richard A. et al. West Virginia Politics and Government (1996)
Callahan, James M. Semi-Centennial History of West Virginia (1913), online, old useful narrative

Callahan, James Morton. History of West Virginia (1923) 3 vol, with many biographies

Fast, Richard E. The history and government of West Virginia (1901) online edition, detailed political narrative to 1900
Rice, Otis K. West Virginia: A History (1985)
Rice, Otis K. and Stephen W. Brown. West Virginia: A History, 2d ed. (1993), a standard history
William, John Alexander. West Virginia: A History for Beginners. 2nd ed. Charleston, W.Va.: Appalachian Editions, 1997.
William, John Alexander. West Virginia: A Bicentennial History (1976)
William, John Alexander. Appalachia: A History (2002) online edition

Scholarly secondary studies

Pre 1877

Ambler, Charles H. Sectionalism in Virginia from 1776 to 1861 (1910)
Rasmussen, Barbara. "Charles Ambler's Sectionalism in Virginia: An Appreciation," West Virginia History, Spring 2009, Vol. 3 Issue 1, pp 1–35
Ambler, Charles H. A History of Education in West Virginia From Early Colonial Times to 1949  (1951), 1000 pages
Curry, Richard Orr. A House Divided: A Study of Statehood Politics and Copperhead Movement in West Virginia (1964)
Curry, Richard Orr. "A Reappraisal of Statehood Politics in West Virginia", Journal of Southern History 28 (November 1962): 403–21. in JSTOR
Curry, Richard Orr. "Crisis Politics in West Virginia, 1861–1870," in Richard O. Curry ed., Radicalism, Racism, and Party Realignment: The Border States During Reconstruction (1969)
Engle, Stephen D. "Mountaineer Reconstruction: Blacks in the Political Reconstruction of West Virginia," Journal of Negro History, Vol. 78, No. 3 (Summer, 1993), pp. 137–165 in JSTOR
Fredette, Allison. "The View from the Border: West Virginia Republicans and Women's Rights in the Age of Emancipation," West Virginia History, Spring2009, Vol. 3 Issue 1, pp 57–80, 1861-1870 era
Gerofsky, Milton. "Reconstruction in West Virginia, Part I and II," West Virginia History 6 (July 1945); Part I, 295–360, 7 (October 1945): Part II, 5–39,
Link, William A. "'This Bastard New Virginia': Slavery, West Virginia Exceptionalism, and the Secession Crisis," West Virginia History, Spring 2009, Vol. 3 Issue 1, pp 37–56
McGregor, James C. The Disruption of Virginia. (1922) full text online
Noe, Kenneth W. "Exterminating Savages: The Union Army and Mountain Guerrillas in Southern West Virginia, 1861–1865." In Noe and Shannon H. Wilson, Civil War in Appalachia (1997), 104–30.
Rice, Otis K. The Allegheny Frontier: West Virginia Beginnings, 1730–1830 (1970),
Riccards, Michael P. "Lincoln and the Political Question: The Creation of the State of West Virginia" Presidential Studies Quarterly, Vol. 27, 1997 online edition
Shade, William G. Democratizing the Old Dominion: Virginia and the Second American Party System, 1824–1861. (1996).
Stealey III, John E. "The Freedmen's Bureau in West Virginia," West Virginia History 39 (January/April 1978): 99–142
Zimring, David R. "'Secession in Favor of the Constitution': How West Virginia Justified Separate Statehood during the Civil War." West Virginia History 3.2 (2009): 23–51. online

Since 1877
Ambler, Charles H. A History of Education in West Virginia From Early Colonial Times to 1949  (1951), 1000 pages
Becker, Jane S. Inventing Tradition: Appalachia and the Construction of an American Folk, 1930–1940 (1998).
Campbell, John C. The Southern Highlander and His Homeland (1921) reissued 1969. online edition
Corbin, David Alan. Life, Work, and Rebellion in the Coal Fields: The Southern West Virginia Miners, 1880–1922 (1981)
Conley, Phil. History of West Virginia Coal Industry (Charleston: Education Foundation, 1960)
Corbin, David Alan. "Betrayal in the West Virginia Coal Fields: Eugene V. Debs and the Socialist Party of America, 1912–1914," Journal of American History, Vol. 64, No. 4 (Mar., 1978), pp. 987–1009 in JSTOR
Davis, Donald Edward. Where There Are Mountains: An Environmental History of the Southern Appalachians 2000.
Dix, Keith. What's a Coal Miner to Do? The Mechanization of Coal Mining (1988), changes in the coal industry prior to 1940
Edwards, Pamela. "West Virginia Women in World War II: The Role of Gender, Class, and Race in Shaping Wartime Volunteer Efforts," West Virginia History, Spring 2008, Vol. 2 Issue 1, pp 27–57
Eller, Ronald D. Uneven Ground: Appalachia Since 1945 (2009)
Eller, Ronald D. Miners, Millhands, and Mountaineers: Industrialization of the Appalachian South, 1880–1930 (1982).
Feather, Carl E. Mountain People in a Flat Land: A Popular History of Appalachian Migration to Northeast Ohio, 1940–1965. (1998).
Ford, Thomas R. ed. The Southern Appalachian Region: A Survey. (1967), includes highly detailed statistics.

Kephart, Horace. Our Southern Highlanders. (1922). Reprinted as Our Southern Highlanders: A Narrative of Adventure in the Southern Appalachians and a Study of Life among the Mountaineers . With an Introduction by George Ellison. Knoxville: University of Tennessee Press, 1976.  full text online
Lewis, Ronald L. Transforming the Appalachian Countryside: Railroads, Deforestation, and Social Change in West Virginia, 1880–1920 (1998) online edition
Lewis, Ronald L. Black Coal Miners in America: Race, Class, and Community Conflict (1987).
Lewis, Ronald L. Welsh Americans: A History of Assimilation in the Coalfields (2008)
Lunt, Richard D. Law and Order vs. the Miners: West Virginia, 1907–1933 (1979), On labor conflicts of the early 20th century.
McAteer, Davitt. Monongah: The Tragic Story of the 1907 Monongah Mine Disaster, the Worst Industrial Accident in US History (2007),
Milnes, Gerald. Play of a Fiddle: Traditional Music, Dance, and Folklore in West Virginia. (1999).
Pudup, Mary Beth, Dwight B. Billings, and Altina L. Waller, eds. Appalachia in the Making: The Mountain South in the Nineteenth Century. (1995).

Rottenberg, Don. In the Kingdom of Coal: An American Family and the Rock That Changed the World (2003), owners' perspective online edition
Seltzer, Curtis. Fire in the Hole: Miners and Managers in the American Coal Industry (1985), conflict in the coal industry to the 1980s.
Summers, Festus P. William L. Wilson and Tariff Reform, a Biography (1953) online edition
Thomas, Jerry Bruce. An Appalachian New Deal: West Virginia in the Great Depression (West Virginia University Press, 1998) 316 pp. 
Trotter Jr., Joe William. Coal, Class, and Color: Blacks in Southern West Virginia, 1915–32 (1990)
William, John Alexander. West Virginia and the Captains of Industry (1976), economic history of late 19th century.

External links
Visit wvstatehood.org Where WV history comes alive
WV, An Archaeological Treasure  Online Gallery, Fort Ancients
THE OHIO VALLEY-GREAT LAKES ETHNOHISTORY ARCHIVES: THE MIAMI COLLECTION
Compact History Geographic Overview by Lee Sultzman
Classics of American Colonial History, Dinsmore Documentation
"THE DISCOVERY, SETTLEMENT And present State of KENTUCKE "(Page 100-103) - 1784 Mr John Filson (1747–1788)
 The Appalachian Indian Frontier; "The Edmond Atkin Report and Plan of 1755", edited by Wilbur R. Jacobs, Lincoln, University of Nebraska Press, 1967
 History of the James River and Kanawha Company By Wayland Fuller Dunaway

Primary sources
Elizabeth Cometti, and Festus P. Summers. The Thirty-fifth State: A Documentary History of West Virginia. Morgantown: West Virginia University Library, 1966.

 
West Virginia
West Virginia